John J. DeGoes is a United States Air Force major general who serves as the deputy surgeon general of the United States Air Force. Prior to that, DeGoes most recently served as the commander of the 59th Medical Wing.

References

Living people
Place of birth missing (living people)
Recipients of the Defense Superior Service Medal
Recipients of the Legion of Merit
United States Air Force generals
United States Air Force personnel of the Iraq War
Year of birth missing (living people)